The Winand Toussaint House is a historic house at 203 Aspinwall Avenue in Brookline, Massachusetts.

Description and history 
The -story wood-frame house was built in 1881 by Winand Toussaint, a Belgian immigrant who worked in the furniture business, and may have been the designer of the house. It is an architecturally eclectic work, with elements of Second Empire (the mansard roof), Stick style, and Gothic Revival. The house has a cupola, and perhaps most distinctively, the house's corners are chamfered, with the main entrance at one of the angled ends.

The house was listed on the National Register of Historic Places on October 17, 1985.

See also
National Register of Historic Places listings in Brookline, Massachusetts

References

Houses in Brookline, Massachusetts
Second Empire architecture in Massachusetts
Queen Anne architecture in Massachusetts
Houses completed in 1881
National Register of Historic Places in Brookline, Massachusetts
Houses on the National Register of Historic Places in Norfolk County, Massachusetts
1881 establishments in Massachusetts